Viktor Bankin is a Ukrainian male sport shooter. He competes in pistol competitions, usually in 50 meters events. Bankin is a two-time European bronze medallist (2019 and 2021). In 2022, Bankin became World Championships bronze medallist in the 50 meters pistol event.

References

External links
 

Ukrainian male sport shooters
1990 births
Living people
Sportspeople from Kyiv
21st-century Ukrainian people